Bishop House is a historic home located near Graysontown, Montgomery County, Virginia.  The house was built about 1890, and is a one- to two-story, three-bay, brick dwelling with a double pile central passage plan. It has a standing seam metal gable roof.  Its front porch features turned posts and a baluster bracketed spindle frieze with drop pendants, and a pointed window in the steep pedimented gable.

It was listed on the National Register of Historic Places in 1989.

References

Houses on the National Register of Historic Places in Virginia
Houses completed in 1890
Houses in Montgomery County, Virginia
National Register of Historic Places in Montgomery County, Virginia